Tessa Howard  (born 6 January 1999) is an English field hockey player who plays as a midfielder for East Grinstead and the England and Great Britain national teams.

Club career

She plays club hockey in the Women's England Hockey League Premier Division for East Grinstead.

Howard has also played for Durham University and Cambridge City.

References

External links

1999 births
Living people
English female field hockey players
Women's England Hockey League players
East Grinstead Hockey Club players
Alumni of University College, Durham
Field hockey players at the 2022 Commonwealth Games
Commonwealth Games gold medallists for England
Commonwealth Games medallists in field hockey
Medallists at the 2022 Commonwealth Games